Petra is a 2018 Spanish tragedy film directed by Jaime Rosales. It was screened in the Directors' Fortnight section at the 2018 Cannes Film Festival.

Cast
 Bárbara Lennie as Petra 
 Àlex Brendemühl as Lucas 
 Joan Botey as Jaume
 Marisa Paredes as Marisa 
 Petra Martínez as Julia 
 Carme Plà as Teresa
 Oriol Pla as Pau
 Chema del Barco as Juanjo 
 Natalie Madueño as Martha

References

External links
 

2018 films
2018 drama films
Spanish drama films
2010s Spanish-language films
2010s Catalan-language films
Danish drama films
French drama films
2018 multilingual films
Danish multilingual films
French multilingual films
Spanish multilingual films
2010s Spanish films
2010s French films